South Whitley is a town in Cleveland Township, Whitley County, in the U.S. state of Indiana. The population was 1,751 at the 2010 census. South Whitley is a town in the Midwestern tradition of red brick buildings and tree-lined streets.

History
South Whitley was originally called Springfield, and under the latter name was laid out in 1837. A post office was established that year under the name Whitley. The post office was renamed to South Whitley in 1842, and still operates today.

Geography

Demographics

2010 census
As of the census of 2010, there were 1,751 people, 729 households, and 482 families living in the town. The racial makeup of the town was 98.0% White, 0.2% African American, 0.1% Native American, 0.2% Asian, 0.4% from other races, and 1.1% from two or more races. Hispanic or Latino of any race were 1.9% of the population.

There were 729 households, of which 33.3% had children under the age of 18 living with them, 48.3% were married couples living together, 12.2% had a female householder with no husband present, 5.6% had a male householder with no wife present, and 33.9% were non-families. 27.8% of all households were made up of individuals, and 12.5% had someone living alone who was 65 years of age or older. The average household size was 2.39 and the average family size was 2.92.

The median age in the town was 37.6 years. 25% of residents were under the age of 18; 8.5% were between the ages of 18 and 24; 26.3% were from 25 to 44; 25.3% were from 45 to 64; and 14.9% were 65 years of age or older. The gender makeup of the town was 48.3% male and 51.7% female.

2000 census
As of the census of 2000, there were 1,782 people, 742 households, and 482 families living in the town. The racial makeup of the town was 99.16% White, 0.22% African American, 0.11% Native American, 0.06% Asian, 0.06% Pacific Islander, 0.17% from other races, and 0.22% from two or more races. Hispanic or Latino of any race were 0.51% of the population.

There were 742 households, out of which 31.0% had children under the age of 18 living with them, 50.1% were married couples living together, 11.1% had a female householder with no husband present, and 35.0% were non-families. 30.5% of all households were made up of individuals, and 14.8% had someone living alone who was 65 years of age or older. The average household size was 2.40 and the average family size was 2.97.

In the town, the population was spread out, with 26.8% under the age of 18, 9.1% from 18 to 24, 29.0% from 25 to 44, 18.7% from 45 to 64, and 16.3% who were 65 years of age or older. The median age was 35 years. For every 100 females, there were 92.0 males. For every 100 females age 18 and over, there were 89.0 males.

The median income for a household in the town was $35,114, and the median income for a family was $42,438. Males had a median income of $34,653 versus $21,221 for females. The per capita income for the town was $19,766. About 7.0% of families and 8.2% of the population were below the poverty line, including 12.1% of those under age 18 and 7.2% of those age 65 or over.

Education
The town is served by Whitko Community School Corporation and contains South Whitley Elementary and Whitko Jr/Sr High School.

The town has a lending library, the South Whitley Community Public Library.

Media 
WIOE-FM 101.1 is licensed to South Whitley, but is located in nearby Warsaw.

Notable people
 Janie Fricke, country music singer
 Will Cuppy, humorist and journalist
 Hugo Fox, principal bassoonist in Chicago Symphony Orchestra
 Albert Fredrick Ottomar Germann, scientist and academic
Jennie Bain Wilson, writer of Christian hymns

References

Towns in Whitley County, Indiana
Towns in Indiana
Fort Wayne, IN Metropolitan Statistical Area